MS Seatruck Power is a ro-ro freight ferry that entered service with Seatruck Ferries in February 2012.

History
She is one of four ships built by Flensburger Schiffbau-Gesellschaft, Germany. Seatruck Power is the second newbuild to be completed.

Seatruck Power was launched in October 2011 and was christened by Niamh McManus, the wife of Surefreight's Brian McManus. The ship was completed and handed over on 3 February 2012. Seatruck Power entered service on the Liverpool-Dublin route on 14 February 2012.

Description
Seatruck Power is one of four RoRo 2200 freight ferries, which are the largest ships in the Seatruck fleet. They are the largest ships to operate out of the port of Heysham.

The RoRo 2200 vessels have a freight capacity of 2,166 lane metres over four decks, carrying 151 trailers. Propulsion is provided by two MAN engines and twin screws.

Sister Vessels
Seatruck Performance
Seatruck Precision
Seatruck Progress

References

External links

Ships of Seatruck Ferries
Ferries of the United Kingdom
2011 ships
Ships built in Flensburg
Merchant ships of the Isle of Man